Aliabad (also Romanized as ‘Alīābād; also known as Ali Abad Japlogh) is a village in Ashna Khvor Rural District, in the Central District of Khomeyn County, Markazi Province, Iran. At the 2006 census, its population was 72, in 16 families.

References 

Populated places in Khomeyn County